Ruskin Mark (born 13 December 1957) is a Trinidadian cricketer. He played in eleven first-class matches for Trinidad and Tobago from 1975 to 1979.

See also
 List of Trinidadian representative cricketers

References

External links
 

1957 births
Living people
Trinidad and Tobago cricketers